"Duke of Earl" is a 1962 US number-one song, originally recorded by Gene Chandler. It is the best known of Chandler's songs, and he subsequently dubbed himself "The Duke of Earl". The song was penned by Chandler, Bernice Williams, and Earl Edwards. This song was a 2002 inductee into the Grammy Hall of Fame. It has also been selected by The Rock and Roll Hall of Fame as one of the 500 Songs that Shaped Rock and Roll.

Original version by Gene Chandler
The song originated from warm-up exercises by the Dukays, a vocal group that included Chandler (under his original name, Eugene Dixon) and Earl Edwards and that had already had some success on the R&B chart.  The group would regularly warm up by singing "Do do do do..." in different keys.  On one occasion, Dixon changed the syllables he was singing to include Earl's name, and the chant gradually became the nonsense words "Du..du..du..Duke of Earl".  The pair worked on the song with regular songwriter and mentor Bernice Williams, and then recorded it at Universal Recording Corporation in Chicago with the other members of the Dukays. Musicians on the record included Floyd Morris on piano, Lefty Bates, Phil Upchurch and Kermit Chandler on guitar, Al Duncan on drums, and Cliff Davis and John Board on sax.

However, the Dukays' record label chose instead to release "Nite Owl," offering Dixon the option of releasing "Duke of Earl" as a solo artist. Dixon changed his name to Gene Chandler (a surname taken from that of the actor Jeff Chandler), and the song was released at the end of 1961. "Duke of Earl" debuted on the Billboard Hot 100 chart on January 13, 1962, quickly rising to become number one on both the pop and R&B charts. The song held the number-one spot for three weeks, and was on the Hot 100 for a total of 15 weeks.

Cover versions
The Pearlettes, a girl group, released a cover version of the song (as "Duchess of Earl") in 1962, reaching number 96 on the Billboard chart. Bobbie Smith and the Dream Girls also released an "answer song" titled "Duchess of Earl" in early 1962; however, the two songs are different in music and lyrics.

A rocksteady cover by Alton Ellis with Tommy McCook and The Supersonics Band was released in 1967 in Jamaica by Treasure Isle Records. 

Another cover was recorded by the UK-based doo-wop outfit Darts in 1979. It reached number 6 in the UK Singles Chart.

In 1986, New Edition recorded the album Under the Blue Moon, an album of doo-wop covers, which included the song Duke of Earl.

In 1988, Australian harmony group "Dukes of Earlwood featuring Armondo Hurley" reached number 12 on the Australian charts with a cover of "Duke of Earl". The success of the song came after the popularity of a TV commercial for Decoré Shampoo which used an adaptation of "Duke of Earl" as its jingle.

The Cypress Hill song "Hand on the Pump" from their eponymous 1991 album features the first words of the song ("Duke of..." looped) as a vocal sample throughout the whole song.

References

External links
 Biography of Gene Chandler

1962 singles
1961 songs
Billboard Hot 100 number-one singles
Cashbox number-one singles
Doo-wop songs
Gene Chandler songs
Grammy Hall of Fame Award recipients
Vee-Jay Records singles